General William F. "Buck" Kernan (born January 29, 1946) was born in Fort Sam Houston, Texas. He was commissioned in November 1968 from Officer Candidate School at Fort Benning, Georgia. He holds a Bachelor of Arts degree in history from Our Lady of the Lake University and a Master of Arts degree in personnel administration from Central Michigan University. His military education includes the Infantry Advanced Course, the U.S. Army Command and General Staff College, and the U.S. Army War College.

Kernan's initial assignment was as liaison officer with the 1st Brigade, 82nd Airborne Division, Fort Bragg, North Carolina. Assigned to Vietnam in August 1969, he served with the 1st Battalion, 327th Infantry Regiment, 101st Airborne Division, as a Rifle Platoon Leader, Battalion Reconnaissance Platoon Leader (Tiger Force), and Assistant S3. The Army's Criminal Investigation Command investigated his Tiger Force unit for alleged war crimes committed between May and November 1967, including the torture of prisoners and routine murder of civilians. No formal charges were ever filed. Following this assignment he returned to Fort Bragg, North Carolina, and served as company commander, 2d Battalion (Airborne), 325th Infantry.

Upon completion of the Infantry Officer Advanced Course in March 1974, Kernan was assigned to the U.S. Army Recruiting Command as an area commander in Austin, Texas. Joining the 2nd Ranger Battalion at Fort Lewis, Washington, in April 1976, he commanded two companies and was the assistant S3 before departing in July 1978 to attend the Command and General Staff College at Fort Leavenworth, Kansas. In July 1979, he was assigned to the Military Personnel Center in Washington, D.C., initially to the DA Secretariat, and then to the Officer Personnel Management Directorate as an Infantry Branch Assignment Officer. In August 1981, he was selected to be the U.S. Exchange Officer representing the 82d Airborne Division to the British Parachute Regiment where he commanded Company C, 3 Para, for two years. Upon his return from England in July 1983, Kernan joined the 2d Battalion (Airborne), 508th Infantry Regiment, 82d Airborne Division, where he served as the executive officer and battalion commander. After completing the Army War College in July 1987, he assumed command of the 1st Battalion, 75th Ranger Regiment, Hunter Army Airfield, Georgia. In December 1988, he assumed the duties as deputy commander, 75th Ranger Regiment, Fort Benning, Georgia, and held that position until June 20, 1989, when he assumed command of the 75th Ranger Regiment. On December 20, 1989, he led the 75th Ranger Regiment in its combat parachute assault into Panama during Operation Just Cause. In September 1991, he was assigned to the 7th Infantry Division (Light), Fort Ord, California, where he served as the Assistant Division Commander (Maneuver). In July 1993, he was assigned as the director of plans, policy, and strategic assessments, J5, United States Special Operations Command, MacDill Air Force Base, Florida. General Kernan commanded the 101st Airborne Division (Air Assault) from February 1996 until February 1998 and assumed command of the XVIII Airborne Corps and Fort Bragg on March 12, 1998. Beginning in September 2000, Kernan served as Supreme Allied Commander, Atlantic and Commander in Chief, U.S. Joint Forces Command in Norfolk, Virginia until his retirement from active service in October 2002.

In 2011, Kernan was awarded the third highest honor within the Department of the Army Civilian Awards, the Outstanding Civilian Service Award, for substantial contributions to the U.S. Army community through his work with the Patriot Foundation.

Awards and decorations

Kernan has been decorated for service, to include:

References

External links

 Kernan's memories of Operation Just Cause, photograph
 Chairman of the board of the Airborne Scholarship Association

1946 births
Living people
United States Army generals
United States Army personnel of the Vietnam War
Recipients of the Distinguished Service Medal (US Army)
Recipients of the Legion of Merit
Recipients of the Air Medal
United States Army Command and General Staff College alumni
United States Army War College alumni
Recipients of the Defense Distinguished Service Medal
Colonels of the 75th Ranger Regiment
Our Lady of the Lake University alumni